Ancylis kenneli is a moth belonging to the family Tortricidae. The species was first described by Vladimir Ivanovitsch Kuznetzov in 1962.

It is native to Eurasia.

References

Enarmoniini